BBC World Service Television, often abbreviated to WSTV (World Service Television), was the name of two BBC international satellite television channels between 1991 and 1995. It was the BBC's first foray into worldwide television broadcasting. In Europe, it was the successor to BBC TV Europe, which it replaced on 11 March 1991. The service was also launched in Asia as a 24-hour news and information service with minor differences, a precursor to BBC World News, launched on 14 October 1991.

Unlike the BBC World Service at the time, it was not funded by the British government with a grant-in-aid. Instead, it was funded either by subscription or by commercial advertising, with advertisements that were inserted locally by the cable or satellite providers. In the years that followed, where not broadcast via a particular local provider, the BBC would insert news headlines, trailers for their own programming, and other updates to fill the gaps, these being known as "break fillers".

Availability

Europe
In Europe, BBC WSTV replaced BBC TV Europe on 11 March 1991 as the BBC's subscription-funded entertainment service. Like BBC TV Europe, it was a mix of BBC1 and BBC2. However, in place of BBC TV Europe's near-continuous direct rebroadcast of BBC1 and schedule pattern timed to UK time (GMT/BST), it had a schedule pattern more synchronised to Central European Time and many of its first-run programmes were timeshifted to more suitable times for viewing in CET, as well as showing specially commissioned World Service News bulletins from Television Centre. The BBC World Service News studio looked like the BBC's domestic news, though with different graphics and an on-screen logo. The station also broadcast its own Children's BBC junctions from Presentation Studio A.

Outside Europe
Outside Europe, BBC World Service Television was the name of the 24-hour news, information and current affairs service, launched in Asia on 14 October 1991 as carried by Star TV, and also available from Turkey to South Korea on AsiaSat. Competing against CNN International, it showed current affairs and documentary programming from BBC One and BBC Two in addition to BBC World Service News with entertainment programs aired on Star Plus. Explaining why the company choose to carry BBC WSTV instead of CNN, Richard Li, who was head of Star TV at the time, cited American bias projected in CNN's coverage of the Gulf War, in an interview with The New York Times.

News Corporation, of Rupert Murdoch, began acquiring Star TV in 1993. In March 1994, the BBC and Star TV reached a deal after an out of court settlement, that would gradually drop BBC World Service Television from the satellite broadcaster's offerings. BBC WSTV would be dropped from the channel line-up for the Northeast Asia by mid-April that year, but would be available in the rest of Asia until 31 March 1996.

BBC World Service Television programming was also carried in Africa on M-Net, launched on 15 April 1992, for 11 hours a day. In Canada, its bulletins were carried on CBC Newsworld several times a day.

Presentation

The channel from 1991 until c.1994 used the presentation device of a rotating world: the Computer Originated World, which had previously been used on BBC One between 1985 and 1991. The world symbol remained the same, but the legend at the bottom was altered to a BBC logo with an italic "World Service" beneath. Promotional style and static programme captions mirrored that of BBC1 and 2 at the time and featured the globe symbol above a small BBC logo in the top left corner of promotions and on captions. The sidebar of captions featured a vague wispy line style, similar to that used by WSTV bulletins. The channel also used a break bumper featuring the globe, and a promo bumper featuring the COW globe split into lines to the side and bottom.

Around the time of the relaunch, BBC WSTV adopted a variation of the flag look later to be used by BBC World, which only featured a BBC logo.

The channel had a permanent DOG of the BBC logo in the top right corner of the screen.

Rebranding and reorganisation
On Thursday, 26 January 1995 at 19:00 GMT, BBC World Service Television was split into two new channels at BBC Television Centre in White City:
BBC World (since renamed BBC World News): 24-hour English free-to-air terrestrial international news channel: news bulletins, information, business and financial news magazines and current affairs programmes, officially launched on Monday 16 January 1995 at 19:00 GMT.
 BBC Prime (since replaced by BBC Entertainment): 24-hour English cable lifestyle, variety and entertainment channel: variety, culture, leisure, lifestyle, art and light entertainment programmes, officially launched on Monday 30 January 1995 at 19:00 GMT.

See also

 BBC TV Europe
 BBC Arabic Television
 BBC World Service

References

External links
 BBC World Service Television idents at Transdiffusion
 BBC World Service Television idents including past BBC World at TV World - Videos are no  longer available
 TVARK BBC World Service Television

Defunct BBC television channels
International BBC television channels
Television channels and stations established in 1991
Television channels and stations disestablished in 1995
1991 establishments in the United Kingdom
1995 disestablishments in the United Kingdom